Chelatococcus asaccharovorans is a bacterium from the genus of Chelatococcus.

References

External links
Type strain of Chelatococcus asaccharovorans at BacDive -  the Bacterial Diversity Metadatabase

Hyphomicrobiales
Bacteria described in 1993